List of £10 banknotes, bills, or coins, include:

Current currencies
Sterling
Bank of England £10 note
Bank of Scotland £10 note
The Royal Bank of Scotland £10 note
Bank of Ireland £10 note
Clydesdale Bank £10 note
Egyptian £E 10 note
Falklands £10 note
Gibraltarian £10 note
Guernsey £10 note
Jersey £10 note
Manx £10 note
Sudanese LS 10 note
Saint Helena £10 note
Syrian LS 10 coin

Obsolete currencies
Australian £A 10 note
Bermudian £10 note
Cypriot £C 10 note
Fijian £10 note
Irish pound
Series A IR£10 note
Series B IR£10 note
Series C IR£10 note
Israeli IL10 note
Libyan £L10 note
Maltese £M 10 note
New Brunswick £10 note
New Zealand £NZ 10 note
Nova Scotian £10 note
Palestianian £P10 note
South African £SA 10 note
South West African £10 note
Thirteen Colonies:
 Connecticut £10 bill
 Delawarean £10 bill
 Georgian £10 bill
 Maryland £10 bill
 Massachusettsan £10 bill
 New Hampshire £10 bill
 New Jerseyan £10 bill
 New York £10 bill
 North Carolinian £10 bill
 Pennsylvanian £10 bill
 Rhode Island £10 bill
 South Carolinian £10 bill
 Virginian £10 bill
Tongan £10 note
Western Samoan £10 note

See also
 List of £1
 List of £5 banknotes and coins

Currency
Numismatics